Maximilian Karl, 6th Prince of Thurn and Taxis, full German name: Maximilian Karl Fürst von Thurn und Taxis (3 November 1802 – 10 November 1871) was the sixth Prince of Thurn and Taxis, head of the Thurn-und-Taxis-Post, and Head of the Princely House of Thurn and Taxis from 15 July 1827 until his death on 10 November 1871.

Early life, education, and military career
Maximilian Karl was the fourth child of Karl Alexander, 5th Prince of Thurn and Taxis and his wife Duchess Therese of Mecklenburg-Strelitz, sister of Queen Louise of Prussia. He was born on 3 November 1802 in the so-called Inner Palace of St. Emmeram's Abbey. At the age of nine, Maximilian Karl became Under Lieutenant in Bayer's Fourth Bayerrischen Cheveaulegers-Regiment König. After four years of education at Bildungsinstitut Hofwyl, a Swiss educational institution, he joined the Bavarian army on 25 August 1822. After the death of his father in 1827, Maximilian Karl asked for his dismissal from the army. Afterwards, he continued with his new role as head of the House of Thurn and Taxis, with the advisement and support of his mother.

Marriage and family
Maximilian Karl married Baroness Wilhelmine of Dörnberg, daughter of Ernst, Baron of Dörnberg and his wife Baroness Wilhelmine Henriette Maximiliane of Glauburg, on 24 August 1828 in Regensburg. Maximilian Karl and Wilhelmine had five children:

Prince Karl Wilhelm of Thurn and Taxis (14 April 1829 – 21 July 1829)
Princess Therese Mathilde of Thurn and Taxis (31 August 1830 – 10 September 1883)
Maximilian Anton Lamoral, Hereditary Prince of Thurn and Taxis (28 September 1831 – 26 June 1867)
Prince Egon of Thurn and Taxis (17 November 1832 – 8 February 1892)
Prince Theodor of Thurn and Taxis (9 February 1834 – 1 March 1876)

In their seventh year of marriage, Wilhelmine died at the age of 32. Maximilian Karl mourned her death greatly and constructed the Neo-Gothic mausoleum at St. Emmeram's Abbey for her. Maximilian Karl married secondly to Princess Mathilde Sophie of Oettingen-Oettingen and Oettingen-Spielberg, daughter of Johannes Aloysius III, Prince of Oettingen-Oettingen and Oettingen-Spielberg and his wife Princess Amalie Auguste of Wrede, on 24 January 1839 in Oettingen in Bayern. Maximilian Karl and Mathilde Sophie had twelve children:

Prince Otto of Thurn and Taxis (28 May 1840 – 6 July 1876)
Prince Georg of Thurn and Taxis (11 July 1841 – 22 December 1874)
Prince Paul of Thurn and Taxis (27 May 1843 – 10 March 1879)
Princess Amalie of Thurn and Taxis (12 May 1844 – 12 February 1867)
Prince Hugo of Thurn and Taxis (24 November 1845 – 15 May 1873)
Prince Gustav of Thurn and Taxis (23 February 1848 – 9 July 1914)
Prince Wilhelm of Thurn and Taxis (20 February 1849 – 11 December 1849)
Prince Adolf of Thurn and Taxis (26 May 1850 – 3 January 1890)
Prince Franz of Thurn and Taxis (2 March 1852 – 4 May 1897)
Prince Nikolaus of Thurn and Taxis (2 August 1853 – 26 May 1874)
Prince Alfred of Thurn and Taxis (11 June 1856 – 9 February 1886)
Princess Marie Georgine of Thurn and Taxis (25 December 1857 – 13 February 1909)

In 1843, Maximilian Karl and his family moved to the newly constructed princely castle of the Thurn and Taxis family in Donaustauf, which was completed in the same year as the nearby Walhalla. The castle Donaustauf was completely destroyed during a blaze on 4 March 1880.

Postal career
In 1827, Maximilian Karl was his father's successor as head of the private Thurn-und-Taxis-Post which had its headquarters in Frankfurt am Main. With the annexation of the Free City of Frankfurt by the Kingdom of Prussia in 1866 and the forced sale of Thurn-und-Taxis-Post for three million Thalers ended the era of the Thurn and Taxis family's postal monopoly. The handover took place on 1 July 1867.

Orders and decorations
  Kingdom of Prussia: Knight of the Black Eagle, 23 August 1851

Ancestry

References

Martin Dallmeier / Martha Schad: The Princely House of Thurn und Taxis, Verlag Friedrich Pustet, Regensburg, Germany 1996 .

External links

|- 
! colspan="3" style="background: #bebebe; color: #000000" | Postal offices

1802 births
1871 deaths
People from Regensburg
Hereditary Princes of Thurn and Taxis
German landowners
German Roman Catholics
Members of the Bavarian Reichsrat
Members of the Prussian House of Lords
Knights of the Golden Fleece of Austria
Members of the Württembergian Chamber of Lords
Burials at the Gruftkapelle, St. Emmeram's Abbey
Military personnel of Bavaria